Debora Montanari (born 17 October 1980) is a retired Italian ice hockey player. She competed in the women's tournament at the 2006 Winter Olympics.

References

External links
 

1980 births
Living people
Italian women's ice hockey players
Olympic ice hockey players of Italy
Ice hockey players at the 2006 Winter Olympics
People from Pinerolo
Sportspeople from the Metropolitan City of Turin